Emma award can refer to:

The Finnish musical award ceremony, Emma-gaala.
EMMA (Ethnic Multicultural Media Awards).